Si Kahn (born April 23, 1944) is an American singer-songwriter, activist, and founder and former executive director of Grassroots Leadership.

Biography

Early life and education 
Kahn grew up in State College, Pennsylvania, United States.  When he was 15 his family moved to the Washington, D.C. area, where he graduated from Bethesda-Chevy Chase High School.  His grandfather Gabriel Kahn, his mother Rosalind Kahn, and his father Benjamin Kahn, a rabbi, instilled a strong sense of the family's Jewish heritage as well as teaching him the rudiments of rhythm and harmony as a child.  His uncle, Arnold Aronson, executive secretary of the Leadership Conference on Civil Rights, helped inspire and shape Kahn's career.  In 1965, Kahn earned a bachelor's degree from Harvard University.  In 1995,  he completed a PhD in American Studies from the Union Institute.

Musician and activist 
Kahn moved to the south as an activist in the Civil Rights Movement, and he now lives in Charlotte, North Carolina. Kahn is the founder and former director of Grassroots Leadership, a non-profit organization that advocates for several causes, including prison reform, improved immigration detention policies, and violence prevention. He retired on May 1, 2010.  Most of the profits from Kahn's musical performances benefit this group.  He has also been involved with Save Our Cumberland Mountains, an environmentalist group opposed to strip mining in Appalachia.

Though Kahn writes songs about a variety of topics, he is especially known for songs about workers and their families, like "Aragon Mill" (1974).  He frequently writes songs, and occasionally performs, with singer-songwriter and multi-instrumentalist John McCutcheon.  Kahn usually accompanies himself on a steel-string acoustic guitar, played with brass fingerpicks.

Personal life 
Kahn's younger sister, Jenette Kahn, was President of DC Comics for 26 years until she stepped down in 2002.

Musical style and themes 
Reviewing Kahn's 1974 New Wood album in Christgau's Record Guide: Rock Albums of the Seventies (1981), Robert Christgau observed "willfully austere Appalachian music" and songs that are "correctives every one (despite an occasional baldness of instructional intent) to the romanticizations of Southern pastoral individualism that are currently so profitable." He went on to call Kahn "an aficionado of poor-white virtues, but not at the expense of his vivid understanding of the labor, sadness, frustration, and small-mindedness that go along with them."

By the time of Kahn's 1979 record Home, Christgau had called him "the most gifted songwriter to come out of the folkie tradition since John Prine", possessing a political outlook in songs that are nonetheless "personal, their overriding theme the emotional dislocations of working far from home." While identifying Kahn's asset as living among ordinary people rather than the folk subculture, the critic credited Kahn's "understated colloquial precision" and concluded that, "some will consider the all-acoustic music thin (it's often solo or duet, twice a cappella) and the voice quavery. I find that both evoke the mountain music of the '20s in a way that makes me long for home myself, and I'm from Queens."

On his later albums, Aragon Mill - The Bluegrass Sessions and It's A Dog's Life, he collaborated with the German bluegrass band The Looping Brothers, founded by Ulrich Sieker and Matthias Malcher – two of Europe's best known and awarded blugrass musicians since the 1970s. Kahn himself initiated and featured both albums and joined promotion-touring in Europe as well as the United States. The latest album, It's A Dog's Life (2019) "includes ten previously unrecorded Kahn compositions and features his vocals on three of the thirteen tracks. Those include “Government on Horseback," the first single, where Kahn revives an unrecorded song from 1981.".

Discography
New Wood (1974, June Appal Recordings)
Home (1979, Flying Fish Records and June Appal Recordings)
Doing my Job (1982)
Unfinished Portraits (1984)
Signs of the Times, with John McCutcheon (1986, Rounder Select)
Carry It On (1986, Flying Fish Records)
I'll Be There (1989, Flying Fish Records)
I Have Seen Freedom (1991, Flying Fish Records)
Good Times and Bedtimes (1993, Rounder select, family album)
In My Heart: A Retrospective (1994, StrictlyCountryRecords)
Companion (1997, Appleseed Records)
Been a Long Time (2000, Sliced Bread Records)
Threads (2002, Double Time Music)
We're Still Here, with Liz Meyer and Joost van Es (2004, StrictlyCountryRecords)
Thanksgiving, with Annemarieke Coenders and Linde Nijland (2007, StrictlyCountryRecords)
Courage, with Kathy Mattea (2010, StrictlyCountryRecords)
Bristol Bay, with Jens Kruger (2012, Flying Fish Records)
Aragon Mill: The Bluegrass Sessions, with The Looping Brothers (2013, StrictlyCountryRecords)
It's A Dog's Life, with The Looping Brothers (2019, StrictlyCountryRecords)

Books authored
How People Get Power: Organizing Oppressed Communities for Action (New York: McGraw-Hill, 1970).
Organizing: A Guide for Grassroots Leaders (New York: McGraw-Hill, 1982).  
The Fox in the Henhouse: How Privatization Threatens Democracy, with Elizabeth Minnich (Berrett-Koehler, 2005). 
Creative Community Organizing: A Guide for Rabble Rousers, Activists, and Quiet Lovers of Justice (San Francisco: Berrett-Koehler, 2010).

Sources
 Press, Jaques Cattell (Ed.). ASCAP Biographical Dictionary of Composers, Authors and Publishers, 4th edition, R. R. Bowker, 1980.

References

External links
Official website

1944 births
Living people
American folk musicians
American singer-songwriters
Jewish American songwriters
American community activists
Harvard University alumni
Bethesda-Chevy Chase High School alumni
Political music artists
Flying Fish Records artists
21st-century American Jews